Carboni is an Italian surname. Notable people with the surname include:

Amedeo Carboni, Italian footballer
Andrea Carboni (born 2001), Italian footballer
Berardo Carboni, Italian director
Bernardino Carboni, Italian decorator and wood sculptor of the Baroque period
Edvige Carboni, Italian mystic, venerated in Roman Catholic Church
Ezequiel Alejo Carboni, Argentine footballer
Francesco Carboni, Italian baroque period artist
Franco Carboni, Italian footballer
Gaetano Carboni, Italian former swimmer
Giacomo Carboni (1889-1973), Italian general
Giovanni Battista Carboni, Italian sculptor, painter and writer
Giovanni Bernardo Carboni (1614-1683), Italian artist
Giovanni Carboni (born 1995), Italian cyclist
Guido Carboni, Italian footballer
Jean-Michel Carboni, Businessman and CEO (Engie group)
Jérémie Carboni, French producer, director and a political advisor
Leonardo Carboni, Argentine footballer 
Luca Carboni, Italian musician
Luigi Carboni, Italian painter of the late-Renaissance period
Nicole Carboni (born 1991), Costa Rican-American fashion model, television and athlete
Paola Renata Carboni, Italian mystic
Raffaello Carboni (1817-1875), Italian writer and revolutionary
Romolo Carboni (1911–1999), Italian prelate of the Catholic Church
Roberto Eduardo Carboni, Argentine footballer
Yrius Carboni, Brazilian footballer

Italian-language surnames